Luigi Castagnola (born 22 March 1953) is an Italian former water polo player who competed in the 1976 Summer Olympics.

See also
 List of Olympic medalists in water polo (men)
 List of World Aquatics Championships medalists in water polo

References

External links
 

1953 births
Living people
Italian male water polo players
Water polo players at the 1976 Summer Olympics
Olympic silver medalists for Italy in water polo
Medalists at the 1976 Summer Olympics
Sportspeople from the Province of Genoa
20th-century Italian people
21st-century Italian people